The 7th Vijay Awards ceremony honoring the best of the Tamil film industry in 2012 was held on 11 May 2013 at the Jawaharlal Nehru Indoor Stadium in Chennai. It was hosted by Gopinath and R. Madhavan.

Jury
The jury members were directors Vetrimaran, Venkat Prabhu and Cheran, comedian Yugi Sethu, and cinematographer R. Rathnavelu.

Award winners and nominees
Source:

Favorite Awards

Multiple nominations

The following eighteen films received four nominations or more:

The following thirteen films received multiple awards:

References

External links
 
 

Vijay Awards
2013 Indian film awards